The American House (established 1835) was a hotel in Boston, Massachusetts, located on Hanover Street.
Abraham W. Brigham, Lewis Rice (1837–1874), Henry B. Rice (1868–1888), and Allen E. Jones (c. 1921) served as proprietors. In 1851 the building was expanded, to a design by Charles A. Alexander. In 1868 it had "the first hotel passenger elevator in Boston." By the 1860s it also had "billiard halls, telegraph office, and cafe." In the late 19th century it was described as "the headquarters of the shoe-and-leather trade" in the city. Guests of the hotel and restaurant included John Brown, Ralph Waldo Emerson, William Whitwell Greenough, Charles Savage Homer, Zadoc Long, and George Presbury Rowell. Many groups held meetings there, among them: Granite Cutters' International Association of America, Letter Carriers' Association, National Electric Light Association, and New England Shorthand Reporters' Association. The hotel closed in 1916, and re-opened under new management in 1918. It permanently closed on August 8, 1935, and the building was shortly afterwards demolished to make room for a parking lot. The John F. Kennedy Federal Building now occupies the site.

References

Further reading
 New-Yorker, 1838
 
 Ballou's Pictorial, March 5, 1859, p.157
 Molly W. Berger. Hotel Dreams: Luxury, Technology, and Urban Ambition in America, 1829-1929. Johns Hopkins University Press, 2011

External links

 New York Public Library. 
 Menu for June 13, 1851 
 Menu for April 10, 1856
 Boston Public Library
 American House, Boston. 42 Hanover St. Drawn by Hammatt Billings, engraved by G.G. Smith, c. 1835-1850
 Photo of New American House and Rathskeller, 20th century
 Photo of American House, 1930

Images

Hotel buildings completed in 1851
Demolished buildings and structures in Boston
1835 establishments in Massachusetts
19th century in Boston
Hotels in Boston
Government Center, Boston
Demolished hotels in the United States
Buildings and structures demolished in 1935